John MacLeod (born 21 February 1957) is a Canadian water polo player. He competed in the men's tournament at the 1976 Summer Olympics.

References

External links
 

1957 births
Living people
Canadian male water polo players
Olympic water polo players of Canada
Water polo players at the 1976 Summer Olympics
Place of birth missing (living people)